Eutelsat 36A (formerly Eutelsat W4  and Eutelsat 3 F-4) is a French communications satellite operated by Eutelsat Communications. It was constructed by Alcatel Space and is based on the Spacebus-3000B2 satellite bus.

Launch 
Eutelsat W4 was launched on the maiden flight of the Atlas III launch vehicle, which used the Atlas IIIA configuration. The launch was contracted by International Launch Services (ILS), and occurred on 24 May 2000, at 23:10:05 UTC from Space Launch Complex 36B at the Cape Canaveral Air Force Station (CCAFS).

Eutelsat W4 
Following its launch and on-orbit testing, it was placed in geostationary orbit at 36° East, from where it provides communications services to Russia and Africa. It carries thirty-one transponders, and has an expected on-orbit lifespan of 12 years.

Eutelsat 36A 
In December 2011, Eutelsat announced, that their satellite assets will be renamed under a unified brand name effective from March 2012. This satellite became Eutelsat 36A.

Eutelsat 70C 
Eutelsat 70C at 70.5° East in 2016 and at 70.3° East in 2018–2019.

Eutelsat 80A 
Eutelsat 80A at 80.5° East in 2017–2018.

Eutelsat 48E 
Eutelsat 48E at 48° East since 2019.

References 

Communications satellites in geostationary orbit
Spacecraft launched in 2000
Satellites using the Spacebus bus
Eutelsat satellites